Daiana Garmendia (born 9 September 1991) is an Argentine badminton player. She was part of the Argentina team that finished fourth at the 2010 South American Games. Garmendia competed at the 2015 Pan American Games in Toronto, Canada.

Achievements

BWF International Challenge/Series 
Women's singles

Women's doubles

  BWF International Challenge tournament
  BWF International Series tournament
  BWF Future Series tournament

References

External links 
 

Living people
1991 births
Sportspeople from Buenos Aires Province
Argentine female badminton players
Badminton players at the 2015 Pan American Games
Pan American Games competitors for Argentina
Competitors at the 2010 South American Games